Nelson Luis Adams (born 5 March 1967) is a Puerto Rican boxer. He competed in the 1988 Summer Olympics.

References

1967 births
Living people
Boxers at the 1988 Summer Olympics
Puerto Rican male boxers
Olympic boxers of Puerto Rico
People from Fajardo, Puerto Rico
Pan American Games medalists in boxing
Pan American Games silver medalists for Puerto Rico
Boxers at the 1987 Pan American Games
Light-heavyweight boxers
Medalists at the 1987 Pan American Games